Sonic Foundry, Inc is an information technology company that produces software for distance learning and corporate communication. It is headquartered in Madison, Wisconsin. It is known for originally developing Vegas Pro and Sound Forge.

History
Sonic Foundry was founded in 1991 and is headquartered in Madison, Wisconsin. The company sold Vegas Pro and Sound Forge, along with other programs, to Sony Pictures Digital for US$18 million in 2003, which led to the creation of Sony Creative Software.

As of August 2022, the company produces Mediasite, Mediasite Events, and Global Learning Exchange (GLX), and has announced a product called Vidable.

References

External links
 Sonic Foundry's website

Companies based in Madison, Wisconsin
Software companies based in Wisconsin
Software companies of the United States
1991 establishments in Wisconsin
Software companies established in 1991